Elena of Avalor is an American  franchise created by Disney Junior in 2016.

Main
Main characters recurring across all Elena of Avalor franchise media

Princess Elena Castillo Flores (Aimee Carrero) is the 16-year-old, later 17-year-old, later 18-year-old then twenty year old Crown Princess of Avalor who is the daughter of King Raul and Queen Lucia. She has difficulty taking advice and often does things she wants to do without listening to others. When she was trapped inside a magical amulet by Shuriki following her parents' premature death, she gained the ability to make her royal scepter glow, she can also see spirit animals and ghosts for the Day of the Dead every November. In "The Magic Within", she gains new magical powers after falling into a well of Takaina, which channel through her emotions. Elena is one of the princesses in the Disney World that can do fights, acrobatics, and a very hard technique-kip up. Some of her abilities include:
Channeling magic through her scepter
Fencing
Flexibility, advanced acrobatic (a kip up during "Princess Knight" training, a leg split, and some rolls in several episodes)
Basic combat skills
Princess Isabel Castillo Flores (Jenna Ortega) is the younger sister of Princess Elena who is also an inventor. Both are the daughters of the late King Raul and Queen Lucia. Isabel is very smart and brave, and assists her sister when she needs it.

Zuzo (Keith Ferguson) is a mysterious and wily spirit fox that acts as a link between the human and spirit worlds. In "A Day to Remember", it is shown that Elena can call him by saying his name.

Naomi Turner (Jillian Rose Reed) is a girl who is Elena's best friend, the daughter of Captain Turner, and a member of Elena's Grand Council. In "The Last Laugh", Naomi leaves Avalor to become a sailor, but returns in "Giant Steps". In the finale, Naomi becomes Elena's new chancellor.

Jaquins are a race of creatures that resemble jaguars with the wings and feathers of macaws. They come from the realm of Vallestrella where they train to help guard Avalor from various threats.
 Skylar (Carlos Alazraqui) is a fun-loving male Jaquin and the son of King Verago. He loves to play and seems to not take anything seriously. Whenever Elena needs help he will always be near.
 Migs (Chris Parnell) is a practical male Jaquin, who succeeds Zephyr as Chief of the Jaquins of Avalor. He is easily annoyed by his friends' antics.
 Luna (Yvette Nicole Brown) is a loud and brash female Jaquin who joined the guard. She is also a rebel which often gets her into trouble.
Gabe Núñez (Jorge Diaz) is Elena's close friend and captain of the Royal Guard, which he joined on the day that Elena became crown princess. His parents are bakers. In the book Elena of Avalor: The Essential Guide, it was revealed that Gabe has a secret crush on Elena.

Mateo de Alva (Joseph Haro) is the royal wizard and Alacazar's grandson who is another one of Elena's close friends. He can be shy at times, but is always there to help.

Chancellor Esteban (Christian Lanz) is Elena and Isabel's boastful maternal cousin and Chancellor of Avalor who is formerly part of Elena's Grand Council. His mother was the sister of Queen Lucia and they were the daughters of Luisa and Francisco. Unaware to anyone, he and his old friend Victor Delgado secretly helped Shuriki invade Avalor and he desperately desires to keep this secret out of fear of being rejected by his family. His secret is eventually exposed in "The Magic Within", leading Elena to imprison him for his betrayal, but he manages to escape along with the Delgado family and is now currently working with Ash. In "Captain Mateo", he gains magical powers after falling into the well of Takaina. In "Dreamcatcher", he finally lets go of his past (due to Elena no longer accepting him as a family member) and becomes a sworn ally to Ash and Zopilote. In "Coronation Day", it is revealed that the reason why he helped Shuriki in the first place is because he tried to warn his uncle King Raul of Shuriki's plot in the first place, but was ignored. He eventually reforms and helps Elena defeat the Four Shades of Awesome. Afterwards, Elena finally forgives him for his past crimes.

Francisco Flores (Emiliano Díez) is Elena, Isabel, and Esteban's maternal grandfather. He is part of Elena's Grand Council.

Luisa Flores (Julia Vera) is Elena, Isabel, and Esteban's maternal grandmother. She is part of Elena's Grand Council.

Armando (Joe Nunez) is a frazzled castle servant who helps Elena on her journey to the throne.

Recurring
Captain Daniel Turner (Rich Sommer) is the harbor master and Naomi's father.

Higgins (Mikey Kelley) is a member of Avalor's Royal Guard. He regularly serves as Chancellor Esteban's personal assistant and confidante.

Doña Paloma (Constance Marie) is the magister of the trading guild, she is described by Esteban as the most important leader in Avalor. In "Navidad", it is revealed that Doña Paloma owns an emporium. In "Captain Mateo", she becomes Esteban's replacement on the Grand Council.

Carmen (Justina Machado) is the co-owner of Cafe Angelica and the sister of Julio who works as a chef.

Julio (Jaime Camil) is the co-owner of Cafe Angelica and the brother of Carmen.

Jiku (Lucas Grabeel) is the leader of the small magical creatures called the Noblins, who are known to transform into dogs and turn anything into gold.

Marlena (Gaby Moreno) is a singer and Mateo's family friend.

Mingo, Zoom, and Estrella (Desmond Gerber, Maximus Riegel, and Gia Lopez) are three baby Jaquins and Migs's children.

King Joaquín (Echo Kellum) is the Ruler of the Kingdom of Cariza.

Nico (Wilber Zaldivar) is Skylar's younger brother.

Ciela and Avion (Jenna Lea Rosen and Lincoln Melcher) are young Jaquins and Nico's friends.

Chief Zephyr (Jess Harnell) is the previous leader of Avalor's Jaquin Clan.

King Verago (André Sogliuzzo) is the King of all the Jaquins and the father of Skylar and Nico.

Dulce (Rosie Perez) is Migs' mate and the very calm mother of Mingo, Zoom, and Estrella.

Quita Moz (Cheech Marin) is a sun bird and oracle that lives in Vallestrella.

Lama, Hool, and Qapa (Whoopi Goldberg, Cloris Leachman, and Tony Plana) are three sun birds and friends of Quita Moz.

Cacahuate (Richard Kind) is a spirit sloth and Mateo's chanul.

Flo (Kether Donohue) is an alpacamundi model brought to life by Elena's new magic.

Villains 
Shuriki (Jane Fonda) was the evil sorceress who had been the cause of Elena's 41-year imprisonment in the Amulet of Avalor and the killer of Elena and Isabel's parents, King Raul and Queen Lucia. She took over Avalor with the secret help of Esteban and Victor Delgado. She was defeated in "Elena and the Secret of Avalor", and Elena took her rightful place as Avalor's Crowned Princess. Unfortunately, Shuriki went into hiding in a cottage in distant Avaloran lands and has been secretly working with Victor and his daughter Carla, whom she has been teaching powerful magic to in exchange for their help in taking back the kingdom. However, in the Season 2 special, "Song of the Sirenas", Shuriki is finally killed off for good by Elena, who used the Scepter of Light to finish her off. She is briefly seen in "Coronation Day" as a spirit watching Elena and Ash compete in an Olaball tournament.

Fiero (Héctor Elizondo) is a Malvago. Long ago, Fiero was supposed to be the next Royal Wizard. However, King Raul appointed Alacazar instead, making Fiero angry. Fiero became an evil wizard looking for revenge. In "Spellbound" he goes to Mateo's Royal Wizard coronation to steal a magic book called the Codex Maru. But he was turned into a statue by Mateo. However, he was revived in "Rise of the Sorceress" by Shuriki and the Delgados and joined forces with them to take back the kingdom. In the "Song of the Sirenas" special, however, in a clash between Fiero and Mateo, the Malvago is turned into a statue once again by Mateo, freeing Avalor from the Malvago once more.

Orizaba (Eden Espinosa) is a moth fairy that appeared in "The Scepter of Light" where she tried to plunge the kingdom into darkness with the Eye of Midnight, but Elena managed to defeat her and destroy the Eye forever. She returns in "Finding Zuzo" where she captures Zuzo and attempts to steal his magic stripes in order to return to the mortal world and get revenge on Elena but is once again defeated after stumbling over the skin of a banana, causing her to fall into a pit of lava where she is forever gone into oblivion. She makes one final appearance in "Coronation Day" as a spirit where she competes in an Olaball tournament against Elena alongside Ash.

Troyo (Grant George) is an evil magical coyote who appears in the episode, "Flight of the Jaquins". Long ago, he used to go around tricking people into doing bad stuff for him so he could be King of the Jungle. For this, the Jaquins kicked him out of the jungle. He captures two young Jaquins to force Chief Zephyr to make him King of the Jungle. But was defeated by Skylar and his brother Nico by trapping him with his own trap. He is then tied up in gold vines by the Noblins and taken away. He returns in "The Race for the Realm" where he joins forces with Shuriki after freeing Cruz from imprisonment and leaves the group in "A Tale of Two Scepters". He reappears in "Father-in-Chief" where he captures Chief Zephyr and Mingo and attempts to turn them into butterfrogs, but is foiled by Elena and friends and he himself is turned into a butterfrog instead, and later into a snurtle in "King Skylar" when he tries to turn back. In "Coronation Day", it is revealed that he recently died and is now working for the Grand Macaw as his right hand man. He later competes in an Olaball tournament against Elena alongside Ash.

Victor Delgado (Lou Diamond Phillips) who was the son of the royal treasurer until the day he and Esteban conspired together to help Shuriki take over Avalor. However, Victor and his family were banished from Avalor by Shuriki for years until Elena took the kingdom back. In "King of the Carnaval", Victor and his daughter Carla returned and tried to steal the jewels from the royal treasury until they were stopped and banished by Elena. Victor and Carla returned in "Elena of Avalor: Realm of the Jaquins" where they steal a powerful jewel from the Jaquin realm and free Marimonda, in the end Victor and Carla are revealed to be working for Shuriki to help her take over Avalor again in exchange for making them Malvagos. In "Song of the Sirenas", after Shuriki has been finally killed off by Princess Elena and Fiero is turned back into a statue by Mateo, Victor and Carla escape with Cruz, Vestia, and the jewel of the Scepter of Night and are currently still on the loose. After he and Carla are abandoned by Cruz and Vestia (due to Victor constantly insulting Cruz), they are later reunited with Ash, Victor's long lost wife. In "Not Without My Magic", after reconciling with Ash, he shows her the Scepter of Night's Jewel, who then plans to use it to take over Avalor alongside her husband and daughter. In "Naomi Knows Best", he is captured after a failed attempt to steal Elena's magic while Ash and Carla escape, vowing to come back for him later. In "The Magic Within", he and his family escape with Esteban's help, but he and Carla are abandoned by Ash due to her refusing to let go of her obsession of power (with the latter being turned into a statue in the process), leaving them to be recaptured. He later reforms in "The Lighting Warrior" (having been returned to normal by Mateo) alongside Carla and become allies to Elena. In "Coronation Day", he takes part in the battle against Ash and the Four Shades of Awesome.

Carla Delgado (Myrna Velasco) is the daughter of Victor Delgado. She has spent time undercover in the Avalor palace as Rita, and is reunited with her long-lost mother in "Snow Place Like Home". In "To Save a Sunbird", she is captured by Elena when attempting to rescue Victor. In "The Magic Within", she and her parents escape with Esteban's help, but she and Victor are abandoned by Ash due to her refusing to let go of her obsession of power, leaving them to be recaptured. She and Victor later reform in "The Lighting Warrior" and become allies to Elena. In "Coronation Day", she takes part in the battle against Ash and the Four Shades of Awesome.

Marimonda (Noël Wells) is an evil mythical forest sprite who appeared in the special, "Elena of Avalor: Realm of the Jaquins". She is released by Victor and Carla Delgado and sent to Avalor to destroy it with her vines. Elena manages to catch her by trapping her in a magic jar and sent back to the Jaquin realm.

Cruz (Mario Lopez) is a Jaquin who was next in line to be the new chief of Avalor's Jaquin clan. He first appeared in "A Spy in the Palace", while his major role was in "Shapeshifters" where Chief Zephyr takes away his position due to him not listening and refusing to learn. Angered, he locks Chief Zephyr in a cave and frames Elena and her friends for his disappearance. Elena managed to free Zephyr and clear her name, then she helped catch Cruz and lock him up for treason. Cruz swore he would return with the help of his sister. He returns in "The Race for the Realm" (having been freed by Troyo), where he and Vestia join forces with Shuriki. As of "Song of the Sirenas", after Elena killed off Shuriki and Mateo turned Fiero back into a statue, Cruz and his sister escape with Victor and Carla Delgado with the Scepter of Night's Jewel in their possession. He and Vestia abandon Victor and Carla in "Snow Place Like Home" due to Victor constantly insulting him and later redeem themselves in "Not Without My Magic". In "Coronation Day", he takes part in the battle against Ash and the Four Shades of Awesome.

Vestia (Diane Guerrero) is a Jaquin and the twin sister of Cruz. She and her brother join forces with Shuriki in "The Race for the Realm" after Troyo breaks Cruz out of prison. As of "Song of the Sirenas", after Elena killed off Shuriki and Mateo turned Fiero back into a statue, Vestia and her brother escape with Victor and Carla Delgado with the Scepter of Night's Jewel in their possession. She and her brother abandon Victor and Carla in "Snow Place Like Home" due to Victor constantly insulting Cruz and later redeem themselves in "Not Without My Magic". In "Coronation Day", she takes part in the battle against Ash and the Four Shades of Awesome.

Duke Cristóbal (Javier Muñoz) is Elena's cousin and the ruler of Nueva Vesta who appears in the Season 2 special, "Song of the Sirenas". He is later revealed to be in allegiance with Shuriki, having agreed to help her take over Avalor in exchange for gold. After Shuriki's defeat, he is captured and arrested for betraying his own family.

Malandros are evil shapeshifting dolphin-like creatures who are known enemies to the sirenas. They first appear in "The Tides of Change". When Daria is reluctant to make peace with the humans, she makes a deal with the Malandros to prevent the signing of the peace treaty between humans and sirenas, only for the Malandros to double cross her and take over the sirenas' kingdom after destroying all the coral alarms used to keep the Malandros away. Elena and her friends manage to help the sirenas defeat the Malandros by repairing one of the coral alarms, which drives them away.

Ash Delgado (Grey Griffin) is Victor's wife and Carla's mother who is a Malvago. She reunites with her family in "Snow Place Like Home" and it's revealed in "Not Without My Magic" that she was training to be a Malvago for several years. She and Victor keep arguing over her not returning to the family for years (Victor's side) and him not waiting for her with Carla (Ash's side), but they reconcile when Victor shows Ash the Scepter of Night's Jewel. Ash then decides to use it to become the most powerful Malvago in the world and overthrow Princess Elena alongside Victor and Carla. In "Naomi Knows Best", she works with her family to steal Elena's magic but are foiled, resulting in the Scepter of Night's Jewel being destroyed and Victor being captured. She is eventually captured in "The Magic Within", but she and her family manage to escape with Esteban's help. When Victor and Carla finally decide not to help her anymore, she abandons her family and leaves with Esteban. In "Captain Mateo", she works with her mentor Zopilote to help teach Esteban (who eventually becomes an ally to them in "Dreamcatcher") how to use his new magical powers. Following Zopilote's defeat in "Spirit of the Wizard", she and Esteban attempt to assemble an army of magical people to take over Avalor. In "Coronation Day", after falling into the dark side of the spirit world with Elena following the release of the Four Shades of Awesome, she competes against Elena in a game of Olaball in an attempt to return to the mortal world. After Elena learns that whoever wins the game must stay in the spirit world, she intentionally loses, allowing her to return to the mortal world while Ash remains trapped in the spirit world forever.

Sanza (Taye Diggs) is a rogue green jaguar spirit guide who first appears in "Flower of Light" where he attempts to destroy the portal that connects the mortal and spirit world and bribes Felicia and Guillermo into helping him. Although he succeeds, Elena and friends manage to restore the portal with Felicia's help. He is then captured and arrested by Zuzo. He is briefly seen in "Coronation Day" watching Elena and Ash compete in an Olaball tournament.

Zopilote (Tony Shalhoub) is Ash's mentor who trained her how to be a Malvago and first appears in "Sister of Invention". He can transform into a vulture. In "Captain Mateo", he and Ash help train Esteban (who soon becomes an ally in "Dreamcatcher") with his newly acquired magical powers. In "Spirit of a Wizard", he is transformed into an ordinary bird after a failed attempt to steal Elena's scepter with Ash and Esteban. In "Coronation Day", it is revealed that he recently died prior to the episode. He later competes in an Olaball tournament against Elena alongside Ash.

Tito (Anthony Ramos) is a bandit who first appears in "Team Isa". He can mind-control people by playing his magic guitar. After taking control of Elena and her friends, Isabel works with her friends to help foil his scheme and break his guitar, freeing Elena and friends from his control. He is then captured and arrested for his crimes.

Chatana (Gina Torres) is an evil sorceress with wings who first appears in "The Last Laugh" where she is unwillingly freed from her prison by Elena and Mateo. After meeting Ash and Esteban, she joins forces with them in their quest to take over Avalor in exchange for the return of her magical diadem. She meets her defeat in "Coronation Day".
 Pili (Tom Kenny) is Chatana's talking pet Weasel.
The Four Shades of Awesome (Fred Armisen, Andy García, Mark Hamill, and Jenny Slate) are a group of four evil deities who were imprisoned in the dark side of the spirit world. They only appear in "Coronation Day". After being freed by Ash, they proceeded to wreak havoc in Avalor until they were stopped by Elena and Esteban and are returned to the spirit world.

References

Disney Television Animation characters
Elena of Avalor